Christopher Hesketh  (28 November 1944 – 10 August 2017) was an English World Cup winning professional rugby league footballer who played in the 1960s and 1970s.

Background
Chris Hesketh was born in Wigan, Lancashire, England, and he died aged 72.

Playing career

International honours
Hesketh won caps for England while at Salford in 1968 against Wales, in 1969 against Wales, and France, and won caps for Great Britain while at Salford in 1970 against New Zealand, in the 1970 Rugby League World Cup against France (sub), New Zealand (1-try), and Australia (sub); in 1971 against France, France (sub), and New Zealand (3 matches); in the 1972 Rugby League World Cup against Australia, France, New Zealand (1-try), and Australia; in 1973 against Australia (3 matches); and in 1974 against France (2 matches), Australia (3 matches), and New Zealand (3 matches). For the 1974 Great Britain Lions tour to Australia and New Zealand, Hesketh was named as captain.

Rugby League career
Hesketh started his career at Wigan in 1962, and following the rule change to allow of substitutions, along with Laurie Gilfedder he jointly became Wigan's first substitute on Saturday 14 November 1964. He moved to Salford in 1967, with whom he remained until retiring in 1979. Hesketh worked as a salesman before retiring in 2006.  His death was announced in August 2017.

County Cup Final appearances
Chris Hesketh played left-, i.e. number 4, in Salford's 25–11 victory over Swinton in the 1972–73 Lancashire County Cup Final during the 1972–73 season at Wilderspool Stadium, Warrington on Saturday 21 October 1972, he played left- in the 9–19 defeat by Wigan in the 1973–74  Lancashire County Cup Final at [Wilderspool on Saturday 13 October 1973, and played left- in the 7–16 defeat by Widnes in the 1975–76  Lancashire County Cup Final at Central Park, Wigan on Saturday 4 October 1975.

BBC2 Floodlit Trophy Final appearances
Chris Hesketh played right-, i.e. number 3, in Salford's 0–0 draw with Warrington in the 1974 BBC2 Floodlit Trophy final at The Willows, Salford on Tuesday 17 December 1974, and played right- in the 10–5 victory in the replay at Wilderspool on Tuesday 28 January 1975.

Player's No.6 Trophy Final appearances
Chris Hesketh played left-, i.e. number 4, in Salford's 7–12 defeat by Leeds in the 1972–73 Player's No.6 Trophy Final during the 1972–73 season at Fartown Ground, Huddersfield on Saturday 24 March 1973.

Testimonial match
Chris Hesketh's Testimonial match at Salford took place in 1977.  In the 1976 New Year Honours Hesketh was appointed a Member of the Order of the British Empire (MBE) for his services to rugby league.

References

Further reading

External links
(archived by web.archive.org) World Cup 1970
(archived by web.archive.org) World Cup 1972
When Great Britain won the World Cup
Tracking down the heroes of 1972
Photograph "Bill Ramsey forces his way over" at rlhp.co.uk

1944 births
2017 deaths
England national rugby league team players
English rugby league players
Great Britain national rugby league team captains
Great Britain national rugby league team players
Lancashire rugby league team players
Members of the Order of the British Empire
Rugby league centres
Rugby league five-eighths
Rugby league players from Wigan
Salford Red Devils captains
Salford Red Devils players
Wigan Warriors players